World's Biggest Coffee Morning is Macmillan Cancer Support's biggest fundraising event. Each year, people in the UK and worldwide host their own Coffee Morning. The donations received go towards Macmillan services. In 2016 alone, World's Biggest Coffee Morning raised £29.5 million.

History 
The first Coffee Morning was held in 1990, when a local fundraising committee held a coffee morning where the cost of the coffee was donated to Macmillan. The first nationwide Coffee Morning took place in 1991 with 2,600 supporters taking part. Since then, the World's Biggest Coffee Morning has come a long way; it is now the largest and longest-standing fundraising event of its kind in the UK. In 2016, Coffee Morning raised over £29.5 million to help provide support to people who have cancer across the UK.

Over the years, some Coffee Morning hosts have taken their fundraising to the next level. This includes a Coffee Morning 100 feet underground in Poldark mine in Cornwall, a Coffee Morning on a jet fighter and the most distant Coffee Morning being held in Antarctica.

Corporate supporters 
The official partner of coffee morning is M&S. Since 2010, M&S have raised £10 million by creating limited edition homeware products and selling a range of baked goods with a donation going towards Macmillan Cancer Support.

Notable participants 
Alesha Dixon, English singer-songwriter, dancer, model, and television personality
Larry Lamb, English actor
Mrs Stephen Fry, blogger, author and award-winning Tweeter (and fictional ‘poor, downtrodden wife & mother of his [Stephen Fry’s] five, six or possibly seven kids.")
Martin Clunes, English actor and comedian. 
Ben Fogle, English television presenter, adventurer and writer.
Katherine Jenkins, Welsh classical singer - attended Marks and Spencer coffee morning with executive chairman Stuart Rose.
Sheree Murphy, English actress and television presenter.

See also 
 Cancer in the United Kingdom

References

External links 
 World's Biggest Coffee Morning
 World's Biggest Coffee Morning Facebook
 World's Biggest Coffee Morning Twitter

Cancer fundraisers
Cancer organisations based in the United Kingdom